Lucien Muhlfeld (4 August 1870, in Paris – 1 December 1902, in Paris) was a French novelist and dramatic critic.

After completing his studies at the Lycée Condorcet, Muhlfeld entered the University of Paris, where he took the licentiate degrees in literature and law. He then engaged in literary work as a contributor to various periodicals. He became successively dramatic critic for L'Écho de Paris, La Revue Blanche, and the Revue d'Art Dramatique.

From 1890 to 1895 he was assistant librarian at the University of Paris; but he gave up that position to devote himself entirely to literature. He died prematurely of typhoid fever after eating contaminated oysters.

He was the author of Le Mauvais Désir (1890), La Carrière d'André Tourette (1900), and L'Associée (1902)—all three novels dealing with Parisian life.

His two critical works, La Fin d'un art (1890) and Le monde où l'on imprime (1897), never became popular.

He wrote also (with Pierre Veber) a one-act play entitled Dix ans après (produced at the Odéon in 1897).

Works
 Le Mauvais Désir (1890)
 La Carrière d'André Tourette (1900)
 L'Associée (1902)
 La Fin d'un art (1890)
 Le monde où l'on imprime (1897)
 Dix ans après (with Pierre Veber, 1897).

19th-century French novelists
20th-century French novelists
French theatre critics
Writers from Paris
Deaths from food poisoning
Deaths from typhoid fever
1870 births
1902 deaths
University of Paris alumni
Lycée Condorcet alumni
French male novelists
19th-century French male writers
20th-century French male writers
French male non-fiction writers